Quebec is an unincorporated community in Sweet Grass County, Montana, United States. Quebec is located along Interstate 90, southeast of Big Timber.

History

Quebec was an agricultural community and a railroad stop en route to Big Timber. The town once boasted a general store and a blacksmith. The town progressively fell into decline after the depot was closed down. There are no structures left remaining, and only a couple dirt roads.  However, the railroad sign indicating its status as a former stop is still standing today.

References

Unincorporated communities in Sweet Grass County, Montana
Unincorporated communities in Montana